"Sun Goes Down" (stylized in all caps) is a song by American rapper and singer Lil Nas X. It was released as a single through Columbia on May 21, 2021, as the second single from his first studio album Montero. 

In the song, Lil Nas X addresses his younger closeted self, reflecting on his struggles with bullying and coming to terms with his homosexuality growing up. In contrast to his past music videos carrying surrealistic and futuristic elements, this one is more grounded in reality to reflect the more contemplative nature of the song.

Background and release
On May 3, 2021, Lil Nas X announced that he would perform "Montero (Call Me by Your Name)" and a new song on Saturday Night Live on May 22. On May 13, he revealed the song title, release date and cover art of the song on his social media. The cover depicts him sitting in the sky in a suit controlling water with his fingers, drawing comparisons to Avatar: The Last Airbender. He wrote on Twitter on May 16 that the music video will depict him going back in time to uplift his younger closeted self, and that it is "really special" to him. He elaborates that it is his most "vulnerable" song, noting the song's exploration of his troubled upbringing.

Prior to the song's release, Lil Nas X posted the following message for his younger self on Twitter on February 2, 2021, "Dear 14 year old Montero, I wrote a song with our name in it. It's about a guy I met last summer. I know we promised to never come out publicly, I know we promised never to be 'that' type of gay person, I know we promised to die with the secret, but this will open doors for many other queer people to simply exist. You see this is very scary for me, people will be angry, they will say I'm pushing an agenda. But the truth is, I am. The agenda to make people stay the fuck out of other people's lives and stop dictating who they should be. Sending you love from the future."

The song was released on May 21, 2021, with a music video premiering on YouTube alongside it. Shortly after the song's release, he commented on people's negative reaction to a line about Nicki Minaj. He notes that the song was about his life, of which 6 years were "dedicated" to her, addressing his past as a former Barb, a term for someone who is part of the fandom surrounding Minaj.

Composition
"Sun Goes Down" follows in the footsteps of his previous single "Montero (Call Me by Your Name)", containing prominent homosexual themes. Throughout the song, Lil Nas X describes his feeling of not fitting in with his peers while growing up, noting that the Nicki Minaj fandom community on social media was the only place where he felt he belonged. He further depicts his struggles with bullying and coming to terms with his sexuality, and in the song's chorus, he sings about contemplating suicide.

Music video

The video starts with Lil Nas X depicted meditating above a lake of water with a galactic backdrop dressed in white, manipulating water with his hands. The video continues with him skimming through memories, including music videos for previous songs. He then enters a memory of himself in high school, first at his work at Taco Bell, and later being depicted praying in his bedroom to God to take away his gay thoughts. The video later cuts to a prom dance, where his teenage self struggles to fit in, before leaving to hide in the bathroom to cry. After composing himself in front of the mirror, his older self appears behind him, lending him a supporting hand, leading him back to the prom, where he is now far more comfortable, being depicted dancing with his friends.

Like past music videos of Lil Nas X, this video uses elements of surrealism and futurism, but tones it down to keep it grounded in reality, as he wanted it to feel "very real". The concept for the video was largely the brainchild of Lil Nas X himself, though the visuals were co-directed by the L.A.-based Psycho Films.

Track listing
Digital download / streaming
"Sun Goes Down"2:48

Credits and personnel
Credits adapted from Tidal.

Lil Nas Xvocals, songwriting
Omer Fedisongwriting, production
Roy Lenzosongwriting, production
Take a Daytripproduction
David Biralsongwriting
Denzel Baptistesongwriting
Popnickmiscellaneous producer
Nick Seeleydrums
Michael Olmosongwriting
Keegan Bachsongwriting
Blake Slatkinsongwriting
Andrew Lucesongwriting
John Hanesengineering
Drew Sligerengineering assistant
Jelli Dormanengineering assistant
Kuk Harrellrecording engineering
Serban Gheneamixing
Chris Gehringermastering

Charts

Certifications

Release history

References

2021 singles
2021 songs
Columbia Records singles
LGBT-related songs
Lil Nas X songs
Songs written by Lil Nas X
Songs written by Omer Fedi
Song recordings produced by Take a Daytrip
Songs about suicide
LGBT and suicide
Songs about bullying
Songs written by KBeaZy